Nu Andromedae (Nu And, ν Andromedae, ν And) is a binary star in the constellation Andromeda. The system has an apparent visual magnitude of 4.5, which is bright enough to be seen with the naked eye. Situated just over a degree to the west of this star is the Andromeda Galaxy.

Nu Andromedae is spectroscopic binary system with a nearly circular orbit that has a period of 4.2828 days. The primary component is a B-type main sequence star with a stellar classification of B5 V. The fainter secondary has a classification of F8 V, which makes it an F-type main sequence star. The pair is about 63 million years old.

Naming

References

External links

Andromedae, Nu
Andromedae, 35
Andromeda (constellation)
B-type main-sequence stars
Spectroscopic binaries
F-type main-sequence stars
003881
0226
004727
Durchmusterung objects